Cucullia fraudatrix is a species of moth of the family Noctuidae. It is found in the Eastern parts of Central Europe up to Korea and Japan and China.

The wingspan is 34–42 mm.

The larvae feed on Artemisia vulgaris.

References

External links 
Vlindernet 

Cucullia
Moths of Japan
Moths of Europe
Moths described in 1837